Newton Amos Blitch (1844 - 1921) was a state legislator and public official in Florida. He served in the Florida House of Representatives and Florida Senate. He represenred Levy County, Florida. His post office was in Williston, Florida. He was a Confederate.

In 1891 he gathered with other legislators supporting Wilkinson Call and was photographed at the Florida capitol.

He married and had five children. His funeral was a major event in Tallahassee His remains were transported to Starke for burial.

References

External links
Findagrave entry

20th-century American politicians
19th-century American politicians
Members of the Florida House of Representatives
Florida state senators

1844 births
1921 deaths